Euphorbia erythroxyloides is a species of plant in the family Euphorbiaceae. It is endemic to Madagascar.  Its natural habitats are subtropical or tropical moist lowland forests and subtropical or tropical moist montane forests. It is threatened by habitat loss.

References

Endemic flora of Madagascar
erythroxyloides
Endangered plants
Taxonomy articles created by Polbot
Taxa named by John Gilbert Baker